Beena Ramakrishnan Pillai is an Indian microbiologist, geneticist, and a scientist at the Institute of Genomics and Integrative Biology. She is known for her studies on 
gene regulation influenced by small RNA and histone variants and is a recipient of the Young Scientist Award of the Council of Scientific and Industrial Research and the Young Scientist Medal of the INSA. The Department of Biotechnology of the Government of India awarded her the National Bioscience Award for Career Development, one of the highest Indian science awards, for her contributions to biosciences, in 2017–18.

Biography 

Pillai, born in the south Indian state of Kerala, obtained her BSc in microbiology from Ramnarain Ruia College of the University of Mumbai in 1995 and joined the Indian Institute of Science for the integrated program which earned her an MS in life sciences in 1998 and a PhD in 2002. She did her post-doctoral training as a fellow at the Institute of Genomics and Integrative Biology (IGIB) during 2002–04 and started her career at IGIB as a scientist in 2004. After serving as a principal scientist during 2007–11, she holds the position of a senior principal scientist and heads a laboratory, popularly known as Beena Pillai's Lab, as its principal investigator where she hosts several researchers.
 
Pillai's research focuses the fields of non-coding RNA in neuronal function and dysfunction, regulation of neural gene expression mediated by histone variants and nerve regeneration factor from Earthworm. She has published a number of articles; ResearchGate, an online repository of scientific articles has listed 79 of them.

Awards and honors 
Pillai received the Young Scientist Award of the Council of Scientific and Industrial Research in 2008 for her work in transcriptomics and a year later, she was selected by the Indian National Science Academy for the 2009 Young Scientist Medal. The Department of Biotechnology of the Government of India awarded her the National Bioscience Award for Career Development, one of the highest Indian science awards, for her contributions to biosciences, in 2017–18.

Selected bibliography

See also 

 Zebrafish
 microRNA

Notes

References

External links 
 
 
 

Indian scientific authors
Year of birth missing (living people)
N-BIOS Prize recipients
Indian microbiologists
Indian geneticists
University of Mumbai alumni
Indian Institute of Science alumni
People from Kerala
Malayali people
Living people